Because I'm Awesome is the second studio album by the American punk band The Dollyrots.  It was released on March 13, 2007 on Blackheart Records.

Tracks featured in  TV shows include "Because I'm Awesome", featured on Ugly Betty and "Watch Me Go (Kissed Me, Killed Me)", featured on The Simple Life.  The song "Because I'm Awesome" was also featured in a back-to-school commercial for Kohl's department store as well as the 2008 film The Sisterhood of the Traveling Pants 2. The band performed "Because I'm Awesome" on an episode of Greek as well.

Reception
Rick Anderson on Allmusic rated the album four stars out of five. Anderson described the album as "the same tight, gleefully snotty bubblegum punk as what you heard on Eat My Heart Out, except maybe just a bit bigger and just a bit sonically fuller this time around -- par for the course when a band like this starts to mature and gets the budget of an established label behind it." Lana Cooper on website PopMatters awarded the album eight out of ten, describing the band's sound as "the same as it ever was, with clever, catchy lyrics running around a track of straightforward, chugging pop-punk". In a positive review, Bill James on website Monsters and Critics said that "the album as a whole is more than can be described in any one track" and that it contained "fun, rollicking songs, often laced with a political barb and punk attitude to create a unique sound".

Track listing

Personnel
The following people worked on the album:

The Dollyrots
Kelly Ogden – vocals, bass, spoons
Luis Cabezas – guitar, vocals, piano
Amy Wood – drums
Other musicians
Melanie Cabezas – additional backing vocals
Chris Black – additional backing vocals
Jimmy Coup – additional backing vocals
Kenny Laguna – additional backing vocals

Production
John Fields – producer, recording, mixing
Chris Testa– recording
Steven Miller – mixing
Jacques Wait – producer, recording, mixing, preproduction/demos
Kenny Laguna – additional production
Derek Bramble – recording
Luis Cabezas – additional production
Greg Calbi – mastering
Cover
Steve Dixey – cover artwork
Robert Jones – bunny illustration
Carianne Laguna – layout/design
Jed Luczynski – back tray photo
Sonja Pacho – inside photo

References

External links

2007 albums
Blackheart Records albums
The Dollyrots albums
Albums produced by John Fields (record producer)